Rhinotragini is a tribe of beetles in the subfamily Cerambycinae.

Genera 
Rhinotragini contains the following genera:
 Acatinga Santos-Silva, Martins & Clarke, 2010
 Acorethra Bates, 1873
 Acutiphoderes Clarke, 2015
 Acyderophes Clarke, 2015
 Acyphoderes Audinet-Serville, 1833
 Adepimelitta Clarke, 2016
 Aechmutes Bates, 1867
 Agaone Neave, 1939
 Amborotragus Clarke, 2013
 Ameriphoderes Clarke, 2015
 Amerispheca Clarke, 2015
 Anomaloderes Clarke, 2015
 Anomalotragus Clarke, 2010
 Antennommata Clarke, 2010
 Apostropha Bates, 1870
 Brachyphoderes Clarke, 2015
 Bromiades Thomson, 1864
 Caprichasia Clarke, 2013
 Carenoptomerus Tavakilian & Penaherrera-Leiva, 2003
 Catorthontus Waterhouse, 1880
 Chariergodes Zajciw, 1963
 Charisia Champion, 1892
 Chrysaethe Bates, 1873
 Chrysommata Penaherrera-Leiva & Tavakilian, 2003
 Clepitoides Clarke, 2009
 Corallancyla Tippmann, 1960
 Crossomeles Chemsak & Noguera, 1993
 Cylindrommata Tippmann, 1960
 Eclipta Bates, 1873
 Ecliptoides Tavakilian & Peñaherrera-Leiva, 2005
 Ecliptophanes Melzer, 1934
 Ephippiotragus Clarke, 2013
 Epimelitta Bates, 1870
 Epipoda Clarke, 2014
 Erratamelitta Clarke, 2016
 Erythroplatys White, 1855
 Etimasu Santos-Silva, Martins & Clarke, 2010
 Exepimelitta Clarke, 2016
 Fissipoda Clarke, 2014
 Forficuladeres Clarke, 2015
 Giesberteclipta Santos-Silva, Bezark & Martins, 2012
 Giesberticus Wappes & Santos-Silva, 2019
 Grupiara Martins & Santos-Silva, 2010
 Ischasia Thomson, 1864
 Ischasioides Tavakilian & Penaherrera-Leiva, 2003
 Isthmiade Thomson, 1864
 Iyanola Lingafelter & Ivie, 2013
 Katerinaella Vlasak & Santos-Silva, 2018
 Klugiatragus Clarke, Spooner & Willers, 2015
 Laedorcari Santos-Silva, Clarke & Martins, 2011
 Lygrocharis Melzer, 1927
 Mimommata Penaherrera-Leiva & Tavakilian, 2003
 Monneus Magno, 2001
 Neophygopoda Melzer, 1933
 Neoregostoma Monné & Giesbert, 1992
 Neothomasella Santos-Silva, Bezark & Martins, 2018
 Odontocera Audinet-Serville 1833
 Odontocroton Clarke, 2018
 Odontogracilis Clarke, 2015
 Odontomelitta Clarke, 2016
 Ommata White, 1855
 Optomerus Giesbert, 1996
 Oregostoma Audinet-Serville, 1833
 Ornistomus Thomson, 1864
 Oxylymma Pascoe, 1859
 Oxyommata Zajciw, 1870
 Panamapoda Clarke, 2014
 Pandrosos Bates, 1867
 Paraeclipta Clarke, 2011
 Paramelitta Clarke, 2014
 Paraphygopoda Clarke, 2014
 Parischasia Tavakilian & Peñaherrera-Leiva, 2005
 Pasiphyle Thomson, 1864
 Phespia Bates, 1873
 Phygomelitta Clarke, 2014
 Phygopoda Thomson, 1864
 Phygopoides Penaherrera-Leiva & Tavakilian, 2003
 Pseudacorethra Tavakilian & Penaherrera-Leiva, 2007
 Pseudagaone Tippmann, 1960
 Pseudisthmiade Tavakilian & Peñaherrera-Leiva, 2005
 Pseudophygopoda Tavakilian & Peñaherrera-Leiva, 2007
 Pyrpotyra Santos-Silva, Martins & Clarke, 2010
 Rashelapso Clarke, Martins & Santos-Silva, 2012
 Rhinobatesia Clarke, 2018
 Rhinotragus Germar, 1824
 Rhopalessa Bates, 1873
 Saltanecydalopsis Barriga & Cepeda, 2007
 Sphecomorpha Newman, 1838
 Stenochariergus Giesbert & Hovore, 1989
 Stenopseustes Bates, 1873
 Stultutragus Clarke, 2010
 Sulcommata Penaherrera-Leiva & Tavakilian, 2003
 Thouvenotiana Penaherrera-Leiva & Tavakilian, 2003
 Tomopterchasia Clarke, 2013
 Tomopteropsis Penaherrera-Leiva & Tavakilian, 2003
 Tomopterus Audinet-Serville, 1833
 Xenocrasis Bates, 1873
 Xenocrasoides Tavakilian & Penaherrera-Leiva, 2003

References

 
Cerambycinae